Miss Malaysia Universe 1978, the 12th edition of the Miss Universe Malaysia, was held on 18 May 1978 at the Merlin Hotel, Penang. Yasmin Yusoff of Kuala Lumpur was crowned by the outgoing titleholder, Leong Li Ping of Penang at the end of the event. She then represented Malaysia at the  Miss Universe 1978 pageant in Mexico City, Mexico.

Results

Delegates 
  - Ann Lim Lee
  - Foong Yeng Heng
  - Shahroom Ahmad
  - Yasmin Yusoff
  - Sharon Tan
  - Angeline Tham
  - Florence Corina Yong
  - Stella Chan
  - Susie Ong
  - Rosalind Sim
  - Foong Yen Leng
  - Ngafimah Osir
  - Risia Ali Omar Bajarai
  - Banang Tajang
  - Leona Ann Pinto
  - Nancie Foo Chee Chuan
  - Robiah Ahmad

Notes 

 Starting from this edition of Miss Malaysia Universe, some of the states decided to send two delegates to compete in the national pageant since they were the runner-up in their respective state level pageant.

References

External links 
 

1978 in Malaysia
1978 beauty pageants
1978
Beauty pageants in Malaysia